The "cat hair mustache puzzle" is a colloquial name given to a puzzle in the 1999 adventure game Gabriel Knight 3: Blood of the Sacred, Blood of the Damned. The puzzle involves disguising the protagonist Gabriel Knight with hair from a cat, in order to steal a man's motorcycle rental. It was created by the game's producer, Steven Hill, following a puzzle being worked on by the game's lead designer, Jane Jensen, having to be cut due to budgetary reasons. The designers disliked the puzzle, but because of time constraints, it had to be left in.

The puzzle received generally negative reception. It has frequently been identified as one of the worst puzzles in the adventure game genre, with one writer going so far as to call it partly responsible for the decline in overall popularity of the genre.

Puzzle and solution
The puzzle appears in Gabriel Knight 3: Blood of the Sacred, Blood of the Damned, during which the eponymous character is required to impersonate another man, Detective Mosely, and take his motorcycle rental.

To do this, Gabriel must collect a variety of items. He creates a mustache using masking tape, a piece of which he attaches to a small opening at the bottom of a shed door. He then uses a water bottle sprayer (or 'spritzer') to spray a cat on top of a wall, causing the cat to jump off and run through the shed door opening. This causes part of the cat's fur to become stuck to the tape and torn off, which he takes.

Gabriel then must distract Mosely by getting him to come downstairs. He uses a piece of candy to distract him, causing Mosely to bend over while outside of his room and allowing Gabriel to steal his passport. Gabriel then heads to Mosely's room to steal his gold coat and don it, along with a red cap he finds in the lost and found to hide that he is not bald like Mosely. Gabriel then uses a packet of maple syrup to attach the fur to his face, creating a fake mustache. Using a magic marker, Gabriel then adds a fake mustache to the passport to obscure the differences between their faces. He then returns, disguise complete, and is given Mosely's motorcycle rental.

Concept and creation
The puzzle was created by Gabriel Knight 3: Blood of the Sacred, Blood of the Damned producer Steven Hill. It came as a result of a puzzle created by the game's designer, Jane Jensen, needing to be removed due to budget concerns. The cat hair mustache puzzle was unpopular with the game's lead technical designer, Scott Bilas, as well as other members of the development team, but was included due to time constraints. Jensen attributed the difficulty of the cat hair mustache puzzle to both the length of the puzzle and the lack of hints, though felt it was overblown, even though she did not like it herself.

Reception and legacy

The cat hair mustache puzzle has received negative reception from critics, coming to be known as shorthand for "obscure and illogical actions" players may need to take in adventure games. PC World writer Hayden Dingman called it an "infamous" puzzle and emblematic of how difficult Sierra games can be. Kotaku writer Kirk Hamilton identified it as an icon of terrible puzzles in adventure games, and felt that no one would be able to solve it without a strategy guide. In their review of Gabriel Knight 3, Computer Gaming World writer Tom Chick identified it as the most notable aspect of the game, despite finding puzzles later in the game  more difficult. They explain that the earlier appearance of the puzzle caused a greater impact as a result. Gamasutra writer Christian Nutt felt that the puzzle was obtuse, stating that it was not something a player would ever think to do. Hardcore Gaming 101 writer Kurt Kalata called it the game's most "infamous" puzzle; he felt that such an "odd" puzzle would be appropriate for a more cartoony game like Maniac Mansion: Day of the Tentacle, but that the Gabriel Knight series is more firmly grounded in realism, making the puzzle seem "absurd." A puzzle in the video game Broken Sword 5: The Serpent's Curse requires players to make a goatee and mustache using adhesive strips and stuffed dog fur, spurring IGN writer Chuck Osborn to speculate whether it was a reference to the cat hair mustache puzzle.

Jane Jensen took some blame for the decline in the popularity of adventure games due to Gabriel Knight 3, with game designer Erik Wolpaw placing blame on her for the puzzle's poor design. Wolpaw was critical of the puzzle for requiring people to make a fake mustache in order to impersonate someone without a mustache, and described the actual process of constructing the mustache as "deranged". GamesRadar+ writer Charlie Barratt included it in their list of the "stupidest puzzles" in video games, suggesting that the puzzle was "illogical and irrational" and that the puzzle contributed to adventure games dying out. Despite the blame laid on the puzzle for killing adventure games, author Grant Bollmer disputed this notion, instead placing blame on corporate restructuring, "meddling in the creative process", and an "increasing scale" in video games' popularity.

The puzzle has also been criticized by other game designers. Campo Santo designer and programmer Nels Anderson felt that adventure games from the 1990s were good in spite of their gameplay, claiming that no one plays them for their "obtuse puzzles", citing the cat mustache puzzle specifically. Anderson was critical of the puzzle particularly due to the game expecting players to don a fake mustache to impersonate someone who does not have one. Frictional Games co-founder Thomas Grip identified the puzzle as a "shining example" of what gameplay designers should not do.

See also
The Goat Puzzle – another infamous puzzle from a 1990s adventure game
Le Serpent Rouge puzzle - another puzzle from the same game.

References

Gabriel Knight
Adventure game puzzles
Video game levels